Laura de Carteret is a Canadian actress from St. Catharines, Ontario. She is most noted for her recurring role as Janet in the television series Seed, for which she was a Canadian Screen Award nominee for Best Supporting Actress in a Comedy Series at the 2nd Canadian Screen Awards in 2014.

A longtime stage actress, she was a Dora Mavor Moore Award nominee for Best Actress in a Play, Large Theatre for her performance as Gertrude in Necessary Angel's 2009 production of Hamlet.

Filmography

Film

Television

References

External links

20th-century Canadian actresses
21st-century Canadian actresses
Canadian television actresses
Canadian film actresses
Canadian stage actresses
Living people
Canadian Shakespearean actresses
Actresses from Ontario
People from St. Catharines
Year of birth missing (living people)